Dr. Kent R. Brown was an American playwright and director. He was Professor Emeritus at the University of Arkansas, Fayetteville and former Playwright-In-Residence and Adjunct Professor of English at Fairfield University in Fairfield, Connecticut. 

Dr. Brown is the recipient of a Drama-Logue award, a McLaren Comedy Playwriting Festival award, Mill Mountain New Play Competition and Year End Series New Play Festival awards, a Julie Harris/Beverly Hills Theatre Guild award and a Denver Center Theatre US West TheatreFest Award. From 1985 to 1996 he was co-founder and director of the Mt. Sequoyah New Play Retreat in Fayetteville, Arkansas, where he helped develop fifty new works written by playwrights from across the country. His plays are published by Dramatic Publishing Company. 

Brown died in Greenville, South Carolina, on December 6, 2020, at age 79.

Works
 Valentines and Killer Chili
 Larry's Favorite Chocolate Cake
 A Trick of the Light
 Ciao, Baby!
 Hope 'n Mercy
 Reduced for Quick Sale
 The View From Sunset Towers
 The Phoenix Dimension
 Lover Boy
 Are We There Yet?
 Floral Fantasy
 Designer Genes
 Gooney Bird Greene and Her True Life Adventures
 The Seduction of Chaos
 Dancing the Box Step
 Welcome to Four Way: The Town That Time Forgot
 Two Beers and a Hook Shot
 The Hound of the Baskervilles: A Comic Thriller Starring Shirley Holmes and Jennie Watson
 Gooney Bird Greene and Her Fabulous Animal Parade
 In the Middle of Nowhere
 American Beauty

External links
 Kent R. Brown Profile

References

Fairfield University faculty
American dramatists and playwrights
2020 deaths
Year of birth missing